Francynne Jacintho (born July 16, 1993) is a Brazilian volleyball player, a member of the club Praia Clube.

Sporting achievements

Clubs 
South American Club Championship:
  2014
  2019
Brazilian Championship:
  2014, 2019
Brazilian Cup:
  2015
Brazilian SuperCup:
  2018, 2019

National Team 
Youth South American Championship:
  2008
U18 World Championship:
  2009
Junior South American Championship:
  2010
U20 World Championship:
  2011

Individual
 2010: The Best Blocker Junior South American Championship

References

External links
 Jornaldovolei profile
 Women.Volleybox profile
 FIVB profile
 ClubWorldChampionships.2018.Women.FIVB profile

1993 births
Living people
People from Maringá
Brazilian women's volleyball players
Middle blockers
Sportspeople from Paraná (state)
21st-century Brazilian women